Steve Garvis is an American slalom canoeist who competed from the late 1970s to the mid-1980s. He won four medals at the ICF Canoe Slalom World Championships with a gold (C-2: 1981) a silver (C-2 team: 1983) and two bronzes (C-2: 1983; C-2 team: 1981).

Steve has continued working with youth and Boy Scouts, teaching them about canoeing and camping.

References

American male canoeists
Living people
Year of birth missing (living people)
Medalists at the ICF Canoe Slalom World Championships